Johann Eichhorn may refer to:
 Johann Gottfried Eichhorn, German Protestant theologian
 Johann Eichhorn (serial killer), German serial killer and rapist